The women's K-4 500 metres sprint canoeing event at the 2020 Summer Olympics took place on 6 and 7 August 2021 at the Sea Forest Waterway. 48 canoeists (12 boats of 4) from 10 nations competed.

Background
This was the 10th appearance of the event, having appeared at every Summer Olympics since 1984.

The reigning World Champions were Dóra Bodonyi, Erika Medveczky, Tamara Csipes, and Alida Dóra Gazsó of Hungary. The 2016 Olympic champions were also from Hungary: Gabriella Szabó, Danuta Kozák, Csipes, and Krisztina Fazekas.

Qualification

A National Olympic Committee (NOC) could qualify one place in the event. A total of 10 qualification places were available, all awarded through the 2019 ICF Canoe Sprint World Championships. There were required to be boats from 4 different continents qualified. Thus, the top 7 at the World Championships were guaranteed to qualify, with the 8th, 9th, and 10th spots potentially being reserved for continental qualifiers. Additional places resulted from reallocation of quota spots when individual canoeists were in multiple classes of qualifying boats at the World Championships (10 spots were available, allowing the ROC and Denmark boats to qualify, but were not sufficient to qualify Great Britain).

Qualifying places were awarded to the NOC, not to the individual canoeist who earned the place.

The World Championships places were allocated as follows:

Competition format
Sprint canoeing uses a four-round format for events with 12 boats, with heats, quarterfinals semifinals, and finals. The specifics of the progression format depend on the number of boats ultimately entered.

 Heats: 2 heats of 6 boats each. The top 2 in each heat (4 boats total) advance directly to the semifinals. The remaining 8 boats compete in the quarterfinal.
 Quarterfinal: 1 heat of 8 boats. The top 6 advance to the semifinals. The remaining 2 boats compete in Final B, out of medal contention.
 Semifinals: 2 heats of 5 boats each. The top 4 in each heat (8 boats total) advance to Final A; the remaining 2 boats compete in Final B, out of medal contention.
 Final: 2 heats. Final A has the top 8 boats, awarding the medals and 4th through 8th place. Final B has the remaining 4 boats, ranking them 9th through 12th.

The course is a flatwater course 9 metres wide. The name of the event describes the particular format within sprint canoeing. The "K" format means a kayak, with the canoeist sitting, using a double-bladed paddle to paddle, and steering with a foot-operated rudder (as opposed to a canoe, with a kneeling canoeist, single-bladed paddle, and no rudder). The "4" is the number of canoeists in each boat. The "500 metres" is the distance of each race.

Schedule
The event was held over two consecutive days, with two rounds per day. All sessions started at 9:30 a.m. local time, though there are multiple events with races in each session.

Canoers per team

Results

Heats
Progression System: 1st-2nd to SF, rest to QF.

Heat 1

Heat 2

Quarterfinal
Progression System: 1st-6th to SF, rest to Final B.

Semifinals
Progression System: 1st-4th to Final A, rest to Final B.

Semifinal 1

Semifinal 2

Finals

Final A

Final B

References

Women's K-4 500 metres
Women's events at the 2020 Summer Olympics